Right On is the tenth studio album release by R&B and soul singer Wilson Pickett released in 1970. Hit covers of The Supremes' "You Keep Me Hangin' On" (#16 R&B, #92 Pop) and The Archies' "Sugar Sugar" (#4 R&B, #25 Pop), as well as the Pickett original "She Said Yes" (#20 R&B, #68 Pop) came from these sessions. The album, however, had dismal sales, staying in the bottom parts of the Billboard 200.

The backing band was Cold Grits; consisting of Billy Carter, Harold Cowart, Jimmy O'Rourke and Ron Ziegler; and the Muscle Shoals Rhythm Section.

Track listing
"Groovy Little Woman" (Ernest Smith, Pickett) 2:38
"Funky Way" (Pickett, Dave Crawford) 2:29
"Sugar, Sugar" (Jeff Barry, Andy Kim) 2:56
"Sweet Inspiration" (Dan Penn, Spooner Oldham) 2:53
"This Old Town" (William R. Stevenson, Don Covay, Pickett) 3:23
"You Keep Me Hangin' On" (Holland, Dozier, Holland) 4:54
"Lord, Pity Us All" (Mac Rebennack) 3:19
"It's Still Good" (Jerry Williams Jr., Gary U.S. Bonds) 2:36
"Woman Likes To Hear That" (George Jackson) 2:51
"She Said Yes" (Pickett, William R. Stevenson, Don Covay, Johnny Nash) 3:13
"Hey Joe" (Billy Roberts) 3:03
"Steal Away" (Traditional; arranged by Tom Dowd) 3:50

Personnel
Wilson Pickett – vocals
Eddie Hinton - lead guitar
Jimmy O'Rourke - guitar
Jimmy Johnson – rhythm guitar
David Hood, Harold Cowart – bass guitar
Barry Beckett, Billy Carter – keyboards
Roger Hawkins, Ron "Tubby" Zeigler – drums
Cissy Houston, Jackie Verdell, John Utley, Judy Clay  – backing vocals
Travis Wammack - lead guitar on “Hey Joe”
Technical
Chuck Kirkpatrick, Jerome Gasper, Lew Hahn, Ron Albert - engineer
Haig Adishian - cover design
Jim Cummins, Stephen Paley - photography

Charts

Singles

References

Wilson Pickett albums
1970 albums
Albums produced by Jerry Wexler
Albums produced by Tom Dowd
Atlantic Records albums